is a Japanese professional shogi player ranked 6-dan.

Early life
Nakamura was born on September 26, 1985, in Iruma, Saitama. He was accepted into the Japan Shogi Association's apprentice school at the rank of 6-kyū as a student of shogi professional Michio Takahashi and quickly progressed, being promoted to the rank of 1-dan in 2000 and then to 3-dan in 2002. He obtained professional status and the rank of 4-dan in April 2004, after finishing second in the 34th 3-dan League (October 2003March  2004) with a record of 13 wins and 5 losses.

Personal life
Nakamura's sister Momoko is a women's shogi professional. The two are the second brother and sister pair in professional shogi history to become professionals.

Promotion history
The promotion history for Nakamura is as follows.
 6-kyū: 1999
 1-dan: 2000
 4-dan: April 1, 2004
 5-dan: October 31, 2008
 6-dan: September 1. 2016

References

External links
ShogiHub: Professional Player Info · Nakamura, Ryosuke

Japanese shogi players
Living people
Professional shogi players
Professional shogi players from Saitama Prefecture
1985 births
People from Iruma, Saitama